Hither Hills State Park is a  state park located on the eastern end of the South Fork of Long Island near the hamlet of Montauk, New York.

History
The land that was to become Hither Hills State Park was once slated for private development of a recreational complex, including hotels, casinos, a polo field, and yacht basin, in the early 20th century. After the planned development was blocked by the Long Island State Park Commission, a portion of the private holdings were sold to New York State, who opened the  parcel as Hither Hills State Park in August 1924.

Description

Location and access
The park is located on the South Fork of Long Island at Napeague.  Three additional state parks a few miles farther east are: Montauk Downs State Park, Camp Hero State Park, and Montauk Point State Park.

The nearby hamlet of Montauk is accessible from the park via the Montauk Highway and the Montauk Branch of the Long Island Rail Road. Suffolk Transit's 10C route also serves the beach connecting it with East Hampton and Montauk, and the Amagansett, East Hampton and Montauk Long Island Rail Road stations on the Montauk Branch.

Features and amenities
The park offers a sandy, ocean beach; picnic tables; a playground; recreation programs; a nature trail; hiking; a bridle path; hunting, fishing; a campground with 168 tent and trailer sites near the ocean; cross-country skiing; and a food concession. The park includes Walking Dunes Trail, featuring a view of the parabolic, migrating sand dunes, which are rare in the Eastern United States; most beach dunes are linear and do not migrate.

See also
 List of New York state parks
 Montauk Point land claim

References

External links

 New York State Parks: Hither Hills State Park
 Long Island Exchange: Hither Hills State Park

State parks of New York (state)
East Hampton (town), New York
Beaches of Suffolk County, New York
Robert Moses projects
Parks in Suffolk County, New York